Charles W. Henry School is a historic school located at 601 Carpenter Lane (at Greene Street) in the Mount Airy neighborhood of Philadelphia, Pennsylvania. It is part of the School District of Philadelphia. The building was designed by Henry deCourcy Richards and built by Cramp & Co. in 1906–1908. It is a two-story, 20 bay, red brick building in the Colonial Revival-style. Additions were built in 1949–1950 and 1968.  It features arched entryways and limestone trim. It was the scene of a bombing during its construction in 1906.

The building was added to the National Register of Historic Places in 1988.

References

External links

School buildings on the National Register of Historic Places in Philadelphia
Colonial Revival architecture in Pennsylvania
School buildings completed in 1908
Mount Airy, Philadelphia
1908 establishments in Pennsylvania
School District of Philadelphia
Public K–8 schools in Philadelphia